Michael Alexander Gordon (born 10 November 1984) is an English footballer who most recently played for Walton & Hersham.

Career
Gordon was born in Tooting.

Beginning as an apprentice at Arsenal, Gordon signed for Wimbledon in 2002 and made a total of 19 league appearances. Gordon also played league football with Swindon Town in 2004, but never made a league appearance. Gordon later played non-league football for a number of clubs including Havant & Waterlooville, Aldershot Town, Crawley Town, Sutton United, AFC Wimbledon, Harrow Borough, Hemel Hempstead Town and Northwood. Gordon later played non-league football with Croydon Athletic and Merstham, before signing for Lincoln City on 11 November 2009. He was released by Lincoln City in April 2010.

Further moves include Kingstonian in August 2011, Walton & Hersham in October 2011, Chipstead in October 2012, and Walton & Hersham again in January 2013.

References
General

Specific

1984 births
Living people
English footballers
Wimbledon F.C. players
Swindon Town F.C. players
Havant & Waterlooville F.C. players
Aldershot Town F.C. players
Crawley Town F.C. players
Sutton United F.C. players
AFC Wimbledon players
Harrow Borough F.C. players
Hemel Hempstead Town F.C. players
Northwood F.C. players
Croydon Athletic F.C. players
Merstham F.C. players
Lincoln City F.C. players
Kingstonian F.C. players
Walton & Hersham F.C. players
Chipstead F.C. players
English Football League players
National League (English football) players
Isthmian League players
Association football midfielders